Sungai Kut Muara is a village in Dalat District, Mukah Division in the Malaysian state of Sarawak. It is situated in the area where a tributary Kut River meets the larger Igan River (hence the name, whereby '' means 'confluence').

Sungai Kut Muara has two primary schools, namely Poi Yuk (Chinese) National-Type School and St. Kevin National School.

Sungai Kut Muara is within Kut Muara polling district under Malaysia's federal constituency Mukah and Sarawak's state constituency Dalat.

Dalat District
Villages in Sarawak